This is a list of Serbian manuscripts, containing important works attributed to Serbia or Serbs. The majority of works are theological, with a few biographies and constitutions. The works were written in Cyrillic, except some early works in the Glagolitic script.

The number of early Serbian manuscripts, that is, those made before the end of the 14th century, is estimated at 800–1,000.
The number of Serbian manuscripts dating between the 12th and 17th centuries that are located outside Serbia is estimated at 4,000–5,000. The largest number of the manuscripts are located in Europe. The largest and most important collection is housed at the Hilandar on Mount Athos. Next, the second largest collection is most likely found in Russia, where hundreds of manuscripts are held. More than a thousand of medieval manuscripts were destroyed during the German bombing of Belgrade (1941). The Digital National Library of Serbia (NBS) has digitalized several manuscripts, included at their website.

Middle Ages

Early modern period
Cetinje chronicle
Belgrade Armorial II
Tronoša chronicle
Vrhobreznica Chronicle, 1650

See also 
Medieval Serbian charters
Medieval Serbian literature
Medieval Serbian law
Serbian chronicles

References

Sources
Cernic, L. and Bogdanovic, D., 1981. About Attribution of Medieval Serbian Cyrillic Manuscripts. Textology of Medieval South Slavic Literature.

External links

 
 
Manuscripts
Medieval
History of the Serbo-Croatian language